The women's 470 class at the 2014 ISAF Sailing World Championships was held in Santander, Spain 14–20 September.

Results

References

Women's 470
470 World Championships
2014 in Spanish women's sport
ISAF